This is a list of artists who have once recorded for Jive Records.
Listed in parentheses are names of Jive-affiliated labels, if applicable, under which the artist recorded.

0-9
 311 (Volcano Entertainment/Volcano Records)
 3LW

A
 A Flock of Seagulls
 A Tribe Called Quest
 Aaliyah (Blackground/Jive)
 Aaron Carter
 Agnez Mo (Chery Party/Sony Music Entertainment)
 Akinyele (rapper) (Volcano/Jive)
 Allison Iraheta (19 Recordings/Jive)
 American Juniors
 Amie Miriello
 Ant Banks
 Anthony Hamilton
 Apocalyptica
 Atom Smash

B
 B-Legit (Sick Wid It/Jive)
 Backstreet Boys
 Bei Maejor
 Big Boi
 Big Fun
 Billy Ocean
 Blow Pop
 Bobby Johnson
 Boogie Down Productions
 Bowling for Soup
 Britney Spears
 Buddy Guy
 Bullet for My Valentine

C
 Cage The Elephant
 Casual
 Celly Cel (Sick Wid It/Jive)
 Chipmunk
 Chris Brown
 Ciara
 Clipse
 Crosby Loggins
 Crystal Bowersox (19 Recordings/JIVE)

D
 D-Nice
 D-Shot
 Daisy Dares You
 Damian
 David Archuleta (19 Recordings/Jive)
 DeWayne Woods
 Dirtbag (Epidemic/Slip-N-Slide/Jive)
 DJ Jazzy Jeff & The Fresh Prince
 Doctor Ice
 Dre (Epidemic/Terror Squad/Jive)
 Dubtribe Sound System (Jive Electro)

E
 E-40 (Sick Wid It/Jive)
 Eamon
 Easyworld
 Ellie Campbell

F
 Factory 81
 Fu-Schnickens

G
 Gady
 Git Fresh (Spy/Jive)
 Goldfinger
 Groove Armada (Jive Electro)
 GS Boyz (Swagg Team Entertainment/Battery/JIVE)

H
 Hardknox (Jive Electro)
 Hed PE
 Hi-Five
 Hot Chelle Rae Hot Chelle Rae (RCA/JIVE)
 Hotstylz (Swagg Team Ent./JIVE)
 Hugh Masekela (Jive Afrika)

I
 Insane Clown Posse (Battery/Jive)

J
 Jacob Latimore
 Jason Downs
 Jazmine Sullivan
 JC Chasez
 Jennifer Love Hewitt
 JLS ([Deal with RCA Records & Epic Records)
 Joe
 Impi
 Jonathan Butler
 Jordin Sparks
 Justin Timberlake

K
 K. Michelle
 Kaliphz
 Keith Murray
 Kelis
 Kelly Clarkson (RCA/JIVE)
 Kevin Cossom (NARS/JIVE Records)
 Kid Rock (Top Dog/Jive)
 Kool Moe Dee
 Kosheen
 Kris Allen (19 Recordings/JIVE)
 KRS-One

L
 La Toya Jackson
 Lemar
 Lil' Mama (Familiar Faces/JIVE)
 Living Things
 Livvi Franc
 Locnville
 Luke

M
 Mademoiselle Juliette
 Mama's Boys
 Mark Shreeve (Jive Electro)
 Marvin Sease
 Marvin Sease (Zomba/Jive)
 Jazzy Jeff
 Melissa Lefton
 Mickey Factz (Battery/JIVE)
 Miguel
 Millie Jackson
 Mobb Deep (Infamous/Jive)
 Mr. Lee
 Ms. Melodie
 Mullage (From The Ground Up/JIVE)
 Mýa
 Mystikal

N
 N-Dubz
 'N Sync (Until their hiatus in 2002)
 Newtrament
 Nick Cannon
 Nick Carter
 Nick Lachey
 Nikki Cleary
 Nivea
 No Secrets

O
 One Call

P
 Papoose
 Paradise Lost
 Pep Love
 Petey Pablo
 P!nk (LaFace)
 Pop!
 Priscilla

Q
 Q-Feel
 Q-Tip

R
 R. Kelly
 R.A. the Rugged Man
 Rednex (Battery/Jive)
 Reel Big Fish
 Relient K
 RichGirl
 Robyn
 Roman Holliday
 Romeo's Daughter

S
 Samantha Fox
 Samantha Jade
 Schoolly D
 Scorcher
 Six D
 Slave Raider
 Smooth
 Solid Harmonie
 Souls of Mischief
 Spice 1
 Steady B
 Steps
 Sway
 Syleena Johnson

T
 T-Pain (Konvict Muzik/Nappy Boy Ent./JIVE)
 Tangerine Dream (Jive Electro)
 Tay Dizm (Nappy Boy Records/JIVE)
 The Click (Sick Wid It/Jive)
 The Comsat Angels
 The Forces of Evil
 The Men They Couldn't Hang
 The Pack (Up All Nite/Jive)
 The Parade
 The Tamperer
 The Time Frequency
 Three Days Grace
 Tight Fit
 Too $hort (Dangerous Music/Jive)
 Tool (Volcano Entertainment/Volcano Records formerly Zoo)
 Travis Porter
 Trina
 Tupac Shakur
 Tyrese

U
 Usher (entertainer)
 UTFO (UTFO/Jive)

V
 Vitamin C

W
 Wakefield
 Wee Papa Girl Rappers
 Whodini
 "Weird Al" Yankovic (Volcano Entertainment/Volcano Records)
 Wretch 32

Y
 YoungBloodZ

See also
Jive Records

Jive Records, former